Central Methodist University (formerly known as Central Methodist College and also known as Central College or CMU) is a private university in Fayette, Missouri. CMU is accredited to offer masters, bachelors, and associate degrees.  The school is affiliated with the United Methodist Church.

History 

On April 13–14, 1853, Central Methodist University was founded by Nathan Scarritt and David Rice McAnally. The college was chartered by the Missouri General Assembly on March 15, 1855. It came about due largely to the diligent work of Nathan Scarritt and David Rice McAnally. Classes began on September 18, 1857, on a  campus with an enrollment of 114 students and a faculty of three. Samuel C. Major was the first graduate, in 1858. In 2004, it was granted university status and changed its name accordingly.

1864 Battle of Fayette

The battle occurred on September 24, 1864, when two bands of southern sympathizers attacked the Union troops stationed in Fayette; it ranged across the town to end on what is now the college's campus.  The guerrillas were led by William "Bloody Bill" Anderson and George Todd, and included among their number were Frank and Jesse James, of outlaw fame. 
Somewhere between 30 and 50 Union fighters faced off against the 250 southern sympathizers, who had disguised themselves with uniforms taken from dead Federal soldiers.

Only 75 members of the large guerrilla party charged the barricaded troops.  Though Anderson and Todd lived on to terrorize northern troops across the state before their deaths, this ill-conceived attack had deadly consequences: after three charges, 13 of Anderson's men were dead and another 30 were wounded.  Only 1 (some accounts say 3) of the Union soldiers was killed, and another five wounded.

In later years, Frank James said that the Fayette fight made him "the worst scared I ever was during the war." In his brief description of the fight, he said, "We charged up to a blockhouse made of railroad ties filled with portholes and then charged back again. The blockhouse was filled with Federal troops and it was like charging a stone wall, only this stone wall belched forth lead."

On October 14, 2007, the Missouri Department of Natural Resources commemorated the battle by placing a marker on the Central Methodist University campus.

Presidents

Campus 

Central Methodist's main campus is in Fayette, Missouri.  Notable features include Linn Memorial United Methodist Church, Swinney Conservatory, Brannock Hall, Little Theatre, Ashby-Hodge Gallery of American Art, and Quadrangle (aka "The Quad").  The college also has the Morrison Observatory next to the president's home across the street from the Fayette city park.  On-campus cultural attractions include Ashby-Hodge Gallery of American Art, Stephens Museum, concerts presented by the Swinney Conservatory of Music and productions hosted in the Little Theatre or on the Quad. The 2004 film Killer Diller was filmed on campus and in various other locations owned by the university.

The Central Methodist College Campus Historic District was listed on the National Register of Historic Places in 1980.  It encompasses 11 contributing buildings.  They are Classic Hall (1911), Howard-Payne Hall (1852, 1889, 1921), Givens Hall (1848-1850), Brannock Hall (1856), Cupples Hall (1899), Clingenpeel Physical Education Building (1906), T. Berry Smith Hall (1890), Swinney Conservatory of Music (1927), Paul H. Linn Memorial Methodist Church and Cross Memorial Tower (1929-1931), Rice H. Cooper Parish House (1927), and Morrison Observatory (1875, 1935).

Buildings located on campus
Brannock Hall
Brannock Hall was built in 1856. It stood through the Civil War, and functioned as Fayette's weather center. Brannock sat empty from 1911 to 1914. It was then remolded into a boys dormitory. In 1928 it became the administrative building on campus. 
Howard-Payne Hall
Howard Payne Hall was built in 1851 boarding house for women by William T. Lucky and Nathan Scarritt. The north wing was added from the burnt bricks that used to be Howard High School. The north wing was used to house classrooms. In 1859, Howard High School was chartered into Howard College. Eventually Central bought Howard College and it became a female dorm. Howard Payne Hall was closed for several years due to the use of soft bricks during its construction. In 1981, the building was reopened and used as a co-ed dorm, and is still used this way in the present.
Givens
Givens is the oldest structure on the CMU campus built in 1848–50. In 1903 it was used as a resident building for Howard Payne College presidents. In 1928 it was turned into a residence hall for Howard Payne female faculty. Givens has served the campus in many different ways. one way being that it was used in World War II as the a Navy sick bay, and has also been used as residence building for female students. It is now used to house alumni and guests.
Cupples Hall
Built in 1896 by Samuel Cupples as a dormitory for men. In 1927 Cupples became a library to house the George M. Smiley collection. In 1969-70 it was renovated, and new addition was added that doubled the size of the library and allowed for the placement of The Little Theatre below.
Classic Hall
Classic Hall was built in 1911 and was considered to be the great learning center on campus. It was originally constructed to help keep Howard Payne College a self-contained college for women. This allowed for Howard Payne to become strictly a dormitory. Classic Hall used to house classrooms, performances, and a women's literary society. In 1981, it was shut down due to declining enrollment and weakening structure. Classic Hall was renovated and reopened in 2012 as a home for Fine Arts.
T. Berry Smith Hall
T. Berry Smith Hall was built from 1894 to 1895. It was designed in an Italianate fashion. In the beginning of the building's history all the departments of college. The Aristotelian and the Phi Alpha Literary Societies used to meet in this building. The room they met in has now been split into classrooms, but the stained glass panels still hang outside the classrooms. In 1928, T-Berry Smith Hall became the science hall on campus, and all other classes were moved out. In 1964 the science and math classes were moved to Stedman, and T. Berry was given its name after Central's chemistry professor and president. T. Berry Smith Hall now houses the social science, education, religion, and philosophy department. Also, Central's band is housed in this building. 
McMurry Hall
McMurry Hall was constructed during the 1920s. It was named after Bishop W. F. McMurry, and was designed to look like an English manor house. It was built to serve as a dormitory for men, but in 1943-45 it served as barracks for V-12 program located at Central Methodist. It was completely renovated in 2002. It now houses 200 students both male and female.
Morrison Observatory
Clingenpeel Physical Education Building
This building was built to replace the old wooden gym in 1906. During this time it was affectionately known as the "Cracker Box" because it was so small that the supporters had to view the game from the balcony. It was named in 1912 after Coach C. A. Clingenpeel. Clingenpeel was remodeled to house a women's gymnasium. It now currently houses physical education offices.
Swinney Conservatory
Was built in 1926-27 and is attached to Linn Memorial. The money donated to build the conservatory came from Mr. and Mrs. Edward F. Swinney, in 1922. It was originally built for Howard Payne College, but was built on Central. It eventually was taken over by Central and became part of the campus. It now houses the music department.
Puckett Field House
Puckett Field House was constructed in from 1948 to 1949. It was dedicated in 1953 to E.P. Puckett who had always believed that CMU needed a proper athletic facility. it originally contained two basketball courts, a gymnastic area, and an indoor track.
Holt Hall
Holt Hall was the first modern structure on campus. It was considered so modern because it had an elevator in the building. It was constructed in 1957 and was named after Ivan Lee Holt, Bishop of Missouri and Central Curator. Holt Hall used to house the dining hall for the campus; it was remodeled in 1983 and was named Mabee dining hall. The dining hall moved to the Student and Community Center in 2005. Holt now functions as a dormitory for females as well as the Admissions Offices.
Burford Hall
Burford Hall was built from 1959 to 1960. It was named after Cyrus Burford, an alumnus of Central and a longtime member of the Board of Curators. The creation of this building also allowed for Howard-Payne to become inhabited by only women, because there was now enough dorm rooms for men.
Stedman Hall
Stedman Hall was built in 1962. The money for the building was donated by Samuel Stedman, a Central alumnus of 1935. He became a financial success on Wall Street. He had always intended to donate money to Central in order to build a new science building. However, he refused to have the building named after him. It was not until his death that the name was changed to Stedman Hall.
Woodward Hall
Woodward was the last male dorm built on campus, and was built in 1964. The building was named after Rev. Ralph L. Woodward who was the president at that time.
The Little Theatre
The Little Theatre was constructed in 1969 by the John Epple family. It seats 228 patrons.
President's Residence
The president's residence is located next to the Morrison Observatory. It was built in 1971 at the request of the president at that time, Harold Hamilton. The university presidents have been living there ever since. 
Phillips Recreation Center
Phillips Recreation Center was built in 1981 at the base of Puckett Field House. It consists of two indoor tennis courts, two racquetball courts, and the E.E. Rich Memorial Swimming Pool.
Thogmorton Center for Allied Health
The Thogmorton Center for Allied Health opened for classes August 2015. It is the newest academic building and offers increased lab and classroom space for nursing, athletic training, occupational and physical therapy assistant; high tech simulation experience labs for nursing, and flexible classroom space for greater faculty-student interaction.

Regional campuses 

The university also has a number of regional locations for continuing and graduate education programs in the Missouri communities of Clinton, Columbia, Dexter, Lake of the Ozarks, Linn, Macon (2010), Neosho, Park Hills, Poplar Bluff, Sedalia, St. Louis, Trenton, Union and Waynesville.

It also has an extensive online program and partnerships with several community colleges in Missouri, Iowa, and Illinois.

Athletics 

The Central Methodist athletic teams are called the Eagles. The university is a member of the National Association of Intercollegiate Athletics (NAIA), primarily competing in the Heart of America Athletic Conference (HAAC) since the 1991–92 academic year; which they were a member on a previous stint from 1971–72 to 1985–86. The Eagles previously competed as an NAIA Independent from 1986–87 to 1990–91; and in the Missouri College Athletic Union (MCAU) from 1924–25 to 1970–71.

Central Methodist competes in 19 intercollegiate varsity sports: Men's sports include baseball, basketball, cross country, football, golf, soccer, track & field and wrestling; basketball, cross country, golf, soccer, softball, track & field, volleyball and wrestling; and co-ed sports include competitive cheer, competitive dance and eSports.

Fight song 
In the late spring of 2006 Central Methodist University adopted an official fight song written by Andrew Glover, a 1983 alumnus of Central Methodist College, called Fighting Eagles.  The previous unofficial fight song had been Hail, Victory written by Central College alum and former drum major Robert Earl Stepp.

Notable alumni 
 Murun Altankhuyag, professional soccer player and member of the Mongolia national football team
 C. Fred Bergsten, American economist, author, and political adviser
 Bill Chott, American actor and comedian
 William Fletcher McMurry, eponym of McMurry University
 Douglas A. Foster, religion historian at Abilene Christian University
 Boone Guyton, naval aviator
 David Holsinger, American composer and conductor
 Michael Johnson (attended), wrestler; The Ultimate Fighter 12 finalist, MMA fighter, currently competing in the Lightweight division of the UFC
 Samuel C. Major, Democratic U.S. Representative from Missouri
 Wendell Mayes, playwright and screenwriter
 Danielle Moore, French-born Missouri Republican state representative and member of NAACP
 Abel Muzorewa, Prime Minister of Zimbabwe
 Ira Richardson, president of Northwest Missouri State University and Adams State College
 John Clark Salyer II, "Father of the National Wildlife Refuge System."
 Claude T. Smith, music composer and conductor
 Huston Smith, religious studies scholar in the United States
 Henry George Steinbrenner III, Part owner of the New York Yankees and elder son of George Steinbrenner.
 Roger B. Wilson, Democratic governor of Missouri
Tyler Steinkamp (attended), Video game streamer

Notable faculty
 Keith E. House, dean and professor, Swinney Conservatory of Music
Nannie Louise Wright, dean, Swinney Conservatory of Music

References

External links

 Official website
 Official athletics website

 
Columbia metropolitan area (Missouri)
Educational institutions established in 1855
Private universities and colleges in Missouri
Education in Howard County, Missouri
Education in Henry County, Missouri
Education in Columbia, Missouri
Education in Carter County, Missouri
Education in Camden County, Missouri
Education in Macon County, Missouri
Education in St. Francois County, Missouri
Education in Butler County, Missouri
Education in Phelps County, Missouri
Education in Pettis County, Missouri
Education in Franklin County, Missouri
Education in St. Louis County, Missouri
1855 establishments in Missouri
Historic districts on the National Register of Historic Places in Missouri
University and college buildings on the National Register of Historic Places in Missouri
Buildings and structures in Howard County, Missouri
National Register of Historic Places in Howard County, Missouri